Jackson Lafferty (born October 9, 1969) is a Canadian territorial level politician.

Early life
Lafferty attended High School in Yellowknife, Northwest Territories. He received his post secondary education at Red Deer College and is currently enrolled at Athabasca University where he is completing a Management Degree.

Political career

Lafferty ran for a seat in the Northwest Territories Legislature in a by-election held in the electoral district of North Slave on July 15, 2005. He won the by-election in a closely contested race over two other candidates. 
He defeated former North Slave MLA Henry Zoe in the 2007 Northwest Territories general election. He was elected to cabinet by his colleagues in the Legislative Assembly. Premier Floyd Roland appointed him Minister of Education, Culture and Employment, as well as Minister of Justice.

Lafferty was re-elected to the 17th Assembly in 2011. During the 17th Legislative Assembly,  Lafferty was the Deputy Premier, Minister of Education, Culture and Employment, Minister Responsible for Official Languages, and Minister Responsible for the Workers’ Safety and Compensation Commission.

Lafferty was acclaimed to the 18th Legislative Assembly in November 2015, and was elected by his peers to be the Speaker of the 18th Legislative Assembly. He was acclaimed to the 19th Northwest Territories Legislative Assembly in October 2019 representing the constituency of Monfwi.

Lafferty resigned his position on June 4, 2021 and announced his intention to run for Tłı̨chǫ Grand Chief later this year.

References

External links
Jackson Lafferty biography

1969 births
Living people
Members of the Legislative Assembly of the Northwest Territories
Athabasca University alumni
First Nations politicians
Members of the Executive Council of the Northwest Territories
21st-century Canadian politicians
Speakers of the Legislative Assembly of the Northwest Territories